Jean Law de Lauriston, (born 5 October, 1719 in Paris, died 16 July 1797, in Paris), was a French military commander and colonial official of Scottish origin. He served twice as Governor General of Pondicherry. Not much is known about his life, but his contributions to the French Colonial Empire are notable.

Law was a nephew of the financier John Law, who had founded the Banque Générale and in 1719 had helped re-finance the French Indies companies.
He was a contemporary of Alivardi Khan who says about him that, "He saw with equal indignation and surprise the progress of the French and the English on the Coromandel Coast as well as in the Deccan."

Law’s son was general and diplomat Jacques Lauriston.

Colonial career

In 1765 
When in 1765 the town of Pondicherry was returned to France after a peace treaty with England, Pondicherry was in ruins. Jean Law de Lauriston, then Governor General set to rebuild the town on the old foundations and after five months 200 European and 2000 Tamil houses had been erected.

Transfer of Yanaon 
Another significant event in the life of Lauriston was the re-transfer of Yanam to the French. A document dated 15 May 1765 showed that the villages of Yanam and Kapulapalem, with certain other lands, had been ceded by John White Hill and George Dolben.  These two were Englishmen acting as agents for Jean Pybus, the head of the English settlement in Masulipatam.  They had negotiated a deal (for taking over the villages) with Jean-Jacques Panon, the French Commissioner, who was Jean Law de Lauriston's deputy when he was Governor General of Pondicherry. The 1765 document mentions that France entered into possession of Yanam and its dependent territories with exemption from all export and import duties.

Memoire of 1767 
Jean Law de Lauriston wrote Mémoires sur quelques affaires de l’Empire Mogol 1756-1761 which can be found in "Libraires de la Société de l'histoire des colonies françaises" Paris.

He stated in his "Memoire of 1767" as “It is from Yanam that we get out best ‘guiness’ (fine cloth). It is possible to have a commerce here worth more than a million livres per year under circumstances more favorable than those in which we are placed now, but always by giving advances much earlier, which we have never been in a position to do. From this place we also procured teakwood, oils rice and other grains both for the men as well as for the animals. Apart from commerce, Yanam enjoyed another kind of importance. The advantages which may be derived in a time of war from the alliances that we the French may conclude with several Rajas who sooner or later cannot fail to be dissatisfied with the English. Although the English gained an effective control over the Circars, Yanam enabled the French to enter into secret relations with the local chieftains. Yanam had some commercial importance".

Death
He died in Paris on July 16, 1797. There is a village in his name in Puducherry which is still today called as "Lawspet".

His son, Jacques Lauriston, became a general in the French army during the Napoleonic Wars.

References 

French colonial governors and administrators
Governors of French India
Civil servants from Paris